The VCU Rams men's tennis team represents Virginia Commonwealth University. Under Coach Paul Kostin’s direction, VCU has reached the NCAA tournament in 18 of the past 19 years and finished a season ranked among the top 25 Division I teams a total of 12 times.

Facilities

Thalhimer Tennis Center

A 6 court facility that currently holds 300 people. It's located between Main and Cary Street in the heart of VCU's Monroe Park Campus, allowing easy access for the student-athletes from their classes and studies.

New Tennis Center

The 2014-2020 six year capital plan calls for a 14 million dollar, state-of-the-art, modern Tennis center that will include 6 indoor courts, a spectator viewing space, and 12 outdoor courts.

National Champions Runner-Up
The Rams put together a remarkable run through the NCAA tournament in 2000 that culminated in VCU’s first-ever appearance in a national championship match. The unseeded Rams strung together five consecutive victories, including wins over three of the nation’s top 13 ranked programs, to set up a showdown with Stanford for the national title. VCU advanced to the “Sweet 16” with a victory over No. 13 Mississippi continued its Cinderella story by upsetting fourth-ranked Illinois in the quarterfinal round. The Rams reached the title match with a thrilling 4-3 victory over powerhouse Tennessee in the Final Four and received a final ranking of No. 9 by the Intercollegiate Tennis Association, at the time, the highest-ever for any VCU sport at the end of a season. The record stood for 11 years until the men's basketball team finished with a final ranking of No. 6.

New Coaching Structure
In 2019, the Rams announced that assistant coach Anthony Rossi would become the head coach of the men's team with former coach Paul Kostin entering a new role as VCU's director of tennis. Kostin had served as the men's coach since 1991, and coached both the women's and men's tennis teams as of 2002. Kostin will continue to oversee the tennis program as a whole, but will focus his attention on the women's team with Rossi stepping into the men's head coach role.

See also
2012–13 VCU Rams men's tennis team

References